Carex austrocaroliniana is a tussock-forming species of perennial sedge in the family Cyperaceae. It is native to south eastern parts of the United States.

The species was first described by the botanist Liberty Hyde Bailey in 1893 as a part of the Bulletin of the Torrey Botanical Club. It has one synonym; Carex caroliniana as described by Samuel Botsford Buckley.

The plant grows in temperate biomes in the south eastern United States from Kentucky in the north to Alabama in the south.

See also
List of Carex species

References

austrocaroliniana
Plants described in 1893
Taxa named by Liberty Hyde Bailey
Flora of North Carolina
Flora of South Carolina
Flora of Alabama
Flora of Kentucky
Flora of Georgia (U.S. state)
Flora of Tennessee